TwinGo! is an iOS game developed by Portuguese developer SpaceNoize, published by Chillingo and released on March 8, 2012.

Critical reception
The game has a Metacritic score of 84% based on 6 reviews.

Modojo said " TwinGo!'s a breath of fresh air in the puzzle genre, a brightly colored, cute and immensely addictive game that's worth $0.99 and even more. Two big thumbs up." Gamezebo wrote "TwinGo! is an experience which is simple, yet challenging (and very accommodating), and full of charm -- the happy Natsu and surly Fuyo are hard to dislike, with their different animations and demeanors, but don't go so overboard with it as to be thought of as "cutesy," which is a fine and difficult line to walk." 148Apps said "The only real issue I have with TwinGo! is that the entire first world is just far too easy." AppSpy wrote "Swiping puzzle fun. Yes we've seen this concept before but Twingo pulls it off with great presentation and a truck full of content." PocketGamerUK said "A smartly designed, surprisingly taxing puzzler that makes the most of its elegantly simple core." AppSmile wrote "Despite an all-too-easy first set of puzzles and the absence of move counters, TwinGo! more than makes up for its shortcomings with clever designs and the elemental make-ups of the twins playing an important role.

References

2012 video games
IOS games
IOS-only games
Puzzle video games
Video games developed in Portugal
Chillingo games